The 1991 Scott Tournament of Hearts, the Canadian women's national curling championship, was held from February 23 to March 2, 1991 at Saskatchewan Place in Saskatoon, Saskatchewan.

Team British Columbia, who was skipped by Julie Sutton won the event after defeating New Brunswick in the final 7–5. This was also New Brunswick's last playoff appearance until .

The Sutton rink would go onto represent Canada at the 1991 Canada Safeway World Women's Curling Championship on home soil in Winnipeg, Manitoba where they got the silver medal after losing to Norway in the final. Additionally, they also would represent Canada at the 1992 Winter Olympics held in Albertville, France since there were no Olympic Trials for the 1992 games.

Yukon/Northwest Territories 7–6 victory over Prince Edward Island in the opening draw of the event was the fifth game to go into a second extra end and the third straight tournament in which this occurred.

Teams
The teams were listed as follows:

Round Robin standings
Final Round Robin standings

Round Robin results

Draw 1

Draw 2

Draw 3

Draw 4

Draw 5

Draw 6

Draw 7

Draw 8

Draw 9

Draw 10

Draw 11

Draw 12

Draw 13

Draw 14

Draw 15

Tiebreakers

Round 1

Round 2

Playoffs

Semifinal

Final

Statistics

Top 5 player percentages
Final Round Robin Percentages

Awards
The all-star team and sportsmanship award winners were as follows:

All-Star Team

Vera Pezer Award 
The Scotties Tournament of Hearts Sportsmanship Award is presented to the curler who best embodies the spirit of curling at the Scotties Tournament of Hearts. The winner was selected in a vote by all players at the tournament. 

Prior to 1998, the award was named after a notable individual in the curling community where the tournament was held that year. For this edition, the award was named after Vera Pezer, who is considered to be one of the most accomplished women's curlers of all-time.

Notes

References

Scotties Tournament of Hearts
Scott Tournament of Hearts
Scott Tournament Of Hearts, 1991
Curling in Saskatoon
1991 in women's curling
February 1991 sports events in North America